In reptiles, the temporal scales are located on the side of the head between the parietal scales and the supralabial scales, and behind the postocular scales.

There are two types of temporal scales:
 Anterior temporals are in contact with the postocular scales.
 Posterior temporals are in vertical rows not in contact with the postocular scales; sometimes called secondary and tertiary temporals.

Related scales
 Parietal scales
 Supralabial scales
 Ocular scales

See also
 Snake scales
 Anatomical terms of location

References

Snake scales